Shamsher Yadav (born 12 December 1994) is an Indian cricketer from Haryana, who plays for Services. He made his first-class debut on 23 November 2015 in the 2015–16 Ranji Trophy. He made his Twenty20 debut on 10 January 2016 in the 2015–16 Syed Mushtaq Ali Trophy.

References

External links
 

1994 births
Living people
Indian cricketers
Haryana cricketers
People from Rohtak
Cricketers from Haryana